"Twilight Zone" is a 1982 hit by Dutch band Golden Earring.  It was written by the band's guitarist George Kooymans, who drew inspiration from the book The Bourne Identity. "Twilight Zone" appears on their 1982 album Cut and pays tribute to the 1960s television series The Twilight Zone. It spent more than half a year (27 weeks) on the U.S. Pop charts. It was the group's sole Top 10 Pop single on the US Billboard Hot 100 (the song reached #16 on the Cashbox chart) and hit No. 1 on the Billboard Top Album Tracks chart, the band's only No. 1 hit in America.<ref>Whitburn, Joel (2010). The Billboard Book of Top 40 Hits',' 9th Edition (Billboard Publications), page 259.</ref>

Lead vocals are divided between Kooymans and Barry Hay. Each sings lead for one half of the first verse (first Kooymans, then Hay), and Hay sings lead for the second verse with backing by Kooymans and provides the spoken lines in the introduction and first verse. Kooymans sings lead on the choruses, backed by Hay.

In the 1990s, the song was included on a volume of Rhino Records' New Wave Hits of the '80s series.  The music video was featured on Volume One of the VHS companion compilation.

Composition
Nic Renshaw, who writes a blog for KSM Guitars, describes the guitar riff at the beginning as an "eighth-note pulse" of B D E D B followed by a sixteenth note and dotted eighth-note, D and E, and another D which is an eighth note. Renshaw considers the "disruption" more interesting than an ordinary pattern, and it acts as a "set-up ... lining up a shot" so that at 3:10, "bassist Rinus Gerritsen knocks that shot out of the park."

 Music video 
The music video, directed by Dick Maas, features a storyline with lead singer Barry Hay as an espionage agent who is apprehended by three henchmen (played by the other members of the band).

The music video was one of the first to feature a cinematic storyline and dance choreography and was a hit on the fledgling MTV network (in somewhat edited form, as the original European cut was notable for a sequence featuring a topless woman), helping the song to become the second international hit for the band. Golden Earring followed the success with an extensive tour of the USA, Canada and Europe.  MTV commissioned the band to shoot a movie of the final 'homecoming' concert of the tour in the Netherlands. The concert film, also directed by Dick Maas, included a brief introductory segment which was an extension of the Twilight Zone video; one writer described it as a "sharp looking video skit about spies or something", but criticized the actually 16mm concert footage as "grainy" and "washy yellow." The concert was released in 1984 as Live from The Twilight Zone along with an album of the concert titled Something Heavy Going Down: Live From The Twilight Zone, it aired on MTV and was published as video on VHS, Beta and Laserdisc.

The Cut album cover's image of the jack of diamonds playing card being shredded by a bullet is used in the video and represents the life of the rogue agent.

Track listing
7" single

12" single

 Personnel 
 George Kooymans - co-lead vocals, lead guitar, backing vocals
 Barry Hay - co-lead vocals, rhythm guitar, spoken words (intro), backing vocals
Rinus Gerritsen - bass guitar, keyboards
Cesar Zuiderwijk - drums

 Additional personnel 

 Robert Jan Stips - synthesizer

 Chart performance 

 Weekly charts 

 Year-end charts 

 Cover versions
Music for The Twilight Zone pinball machine (1992) featured core elements from the song in many of its tracks.

William Shatner covered the song on his 2011 album, Seeking Major Tom.

Scoti*Slate included a cover on their album Good Fight'' in 2013.

See also 
List of Dutch Top 40 number-one singles of 1982
List of Billboard Mainstream Rock number-one songs of the 1980s

References

External links 
[ Song review] at AllMusic
 

1982 singles
1982 songs
Dutch new wave songs
Dutch Top 40 number-one singles
Golden Earring songs
PolyGram singles
Songs written by George Kooymans
The Twilight Zone